I Downloaded a Ghost is a 2004 Canadian fantasy comedy film starring Carlos Alazraqui as Winston the Ghost and Elliot Page as Stella Blackstone.

Plot
Stella Blackstone (Elliot Page) and her best friend Albert (Michael Kanev) are twelve-year-olds with ambitious intentions of creating an extremely spooky Halloween house. While checking for hints online they open up a web link that opens a doorway through which an annoying ghost (Carlos Alazraqui) leaves his world and enters theirs. They find they must help this ghost resolve his problems or put up with him forever.

Cast

Carlos Alazraqui as Winston Pritchett
Elliot Page as Stella Blackstone
Michael Kanev as Albert
Barbara Alyn Woods as Catherine Blackstone
Tim Progosh as Walter Blackstone
Gary Hudson as Fred Tomlinson
Vince Corazza as Jared
Allison Knight as Jennifer #1
Landon Peters as Stone Savage
Meghan Diane as Aunt Sally
Tyler Baptist as Highschool Student

References

External links
 

2004 television films
2004 films
American children's comedy films
American television films
2000s children's comedy films
2000s children's fantasy films
American fantasy comedy films
American films about Halloween
Internet films
2000s fantasy comedy films
2000s English-language films
2000s American films